Carse may refer to:

 Carse, area of fertile, low-lying land occupying certain Scottish river valleys
 Mount Carse, mountain having several peaks in the southern part of the Salvesen Range of South Georgia
 The City of Carse, fantasy role-playing game
 Carse (surname), surname

See also 

 Carré (disambiguation)